John Francis Dwyer (March 25, 1868 – February 4, 1943) was an American right-handed pitcher in Major League Baseball for the Chicago White Stockings (1888–1889), Chicago Pirates (1890), Cincinnati Kelly's Killers (1891), Milwaukee Brewers (1891), St. Louis Browns (1892), and Cincinnati Reds (1892–1899). He was the manager for the Detroit Tigers in 1902.

Baseball career
Dwyer was born in Lee, Massachusetts, in 1868. He started his professional baseball career in 1888 with the Western Association's Chicago Maroons. He won 19 games for the Maroons and then made his major league debut with the National League's Chicago White Stockings in September.

Over the next four years, Dwyer played for several different teams. He became a member of the Cincinnati Reds in June 1892 after making light of St. Louis Browns owner Chris von der Ahe in the newspaper. Von der Ahe released him and fined him $100, though Dwyer said he could have been sold to another ball club for $1,500.

Dwyer played for the Reds from 1892 to the end of his playing career in 1899. On June 23, 1896, he gave up Roger Connor's 123rd career home run, which broke Harry Stovey's previous record of 122. Connor's record of 138 was eventually broken by Babe Ruth.

Dwyer's 1896 season was the best of his career, as he had a 24–11 win–loss record and a 3.15 earned run average. The 24 wins were his career-high.

In 12 major league seasons, Dwyer had a 177–151 record. He had 366 games pitched, 318 games started, 2,819 innings pitched, 271 complete games, 12 shutouts, 6 saves, 565 strikeouts, 764 walks, and a 3.84 ERA.

Dwyer was the second manager of the Detroit Tigers, managing for one season in 1902. He led the team to a 52–83 record. Dwyer briefly umpired in the National League in 1899 and 1901, and in the American League in 1904, during which he umpired Cy Young's perfect game.

Later life
In 1915, Dwyer, then living in Geneva, New York, was appointed to the New York State Athletic Commission by Governor Charles Seymour Whitman. His term expired in 1924 and Governor Al Smith chose to appoint James Farley instead. That same year, Dwyer became the pitching coach of the New York Giants.

On February 4, 1943, Dwyer died while visiting relatives in Pittsfield, Massachusetts. He was 74 years old.

See also
 List of Major League Baseball annual saves leaders
 List of Major League Baseball career complete games leaders
 List of Major League Baseball career hit batsmen leaders

References

External links

1868 births
1943 deaths
19th-century baseball players
Major League Baseball pitchers
Chicago White Stockings players
Chicago Pirates players
Cincinnati Kelly's Killers players
Milwaukee Brewers (AA) players
St. Louis Browns players
Cincinnati Reds players
Detroit Tigers managers
Chicago Maroons players
Hobart Statesmen baseball players
Baseball players from Massachusetts
People from Lee, Massachusetts
People from Geneva, New York
New York State Athletic Commissioners
Sportspeople from Berkshire County, Massachusetts